Ralph Hasenhüttl (born 9 August 1967) is an Austrian professional football manager and former player who was most recently the manager of Premier League club Southampton. During his playing career, he played as a centre forward.

Playing career
Born in Graz, Hasenhüttl began his career with hometown club GAK, making his first team debut in the 1985–86 season. He transferred to Austria Wien in 1989, with whom he won three successive Bundesliga titles and two Austrian Cups. He moved to Austria Salzburg in 1994, where he won another Bundesliga title as well as an Austrian Super Cup. In 1996, Hasenhüttl moved abroad, with spells at Mechelen and Lierse in Belgium. In season 1998–99, he signed for 1. FC Köln, for a fee equivalent to €200,000. In his two years in Cologne, however, he only scored three goals and in 2000 moved to SpVgg Greuther Fürth.

Hasenhüttl finished his career at Bayern Munich II, in the Regionalliga Süd.

Hasenhüttl played eight times for the Austria national team, scoring three goals.

Managerial career

SpVgg Unterhaching
Between 2004 and 2005, Hasenhüttl was a youth-team coach at SpVgg Unterhaching. Following the sacking of Harry Deutinger in March 2007, he became caretaker manager until the appointment of Werner Lorant, under whom he worked as assistant coach. On 4 October 2007, Hasenhüttl became the new head coach. His first match was a 2–2 draw against SSV Reutlingen 05. Unterhaching finished in sixth place that season.

In the 2008–09 season, in the newly formed 3. Liga, the team's performances earned them fourth place in the table, missing out on a play-off place by one point. Unterhaching were eliminated in the first round of the German Cup. In the 2009–10 season, they failed to build upon their success, achieving 31 points in 24 games, resulting in Hasenhüttl's sacking on 22 February 2010. His final match was a 1–1 draw against Borussia Dortmund II on 21 February 2010. He finished with a record of 40 wins, 20 draws, and 28 losses.

VfR Aalen

In January 2011, Hasenhüttl succeeded Rainer Scharinger as the coach of third division VfR Aalen, then in 16th place, one point above the relegation zone. His first match was a 1–1 draw against VfB Stuttgart II. Aalen's survival in the 3. Liga earned him a year's contract extension. In the 2011–12 season, he completely rebuilt the team, bringing in eight new players and releasing 14, with the aim of a mid-table finish. After a slow start to the season, the team found itself in sixth place at the winter break, only a point behind the play-off position. The team's run continued into the second half of the season, which included an eight-game winning streak, earning Hasenhüttl a further two-year contract extension in November 2011. At the end of the season, Aalen finished in second place, earning automatic promotion to the 2. Bundesliga.

During pre-season training in the summer of 2012, Hasenhüttl contracted a Hantavirus infection, but returned to work three weeks into the 2012–13 season. Hasenhüttl had switched from a 4–4–2 to a 4–5–1 formation, to facilitate a fast, counter-attacking game, with success. By the winter break, Aalen were in fifth place. The team finished the season in ninth place, the highest of the newly promoted teams. After two-and-a-half successful years at Aalen, Hasenhüttl resigned in June 2013, when Aalen lost its main sponsor and sporting director Markus Schupp imposed an austerity programme for the following season, with several departing players not being replaced. He finished with a record of 36 wins, 28 draws, and 29 losses.

FC Ingolstadt 04
In October 2013, Hasenhüttl was appointed as coach of Ingolstadt 04, replacing Marco Kurz. In his first season, he took them from bottom of the 2. Bundesliga to tenth place. In the 2014–15 season, Hasenhüttl took Ingolstadt to the Bundesliga for the first time, finishing the season as 2. Bundesliga champions. In the 2015–16 season, he was successful in securing Ingolstadt's Bundesliga survival, finishing in 11th place, but chose not to extend his contract.

RB Leipzig
In May 2016, he was confirmed as the new manager of newly promoted RB Leipzig. He took over on 1 July 2016. His first match was against Dynamo Dresden in the German Cup. Leipzig lost 5–4 in a shootout. In his and the club's debut season in the Bundesliga Hasenhüttl guided Leipzig to a second-place finish. The following season, the club finished sixth, with Hasenhüttl asking for his contract to be terminated as he was not comfortable acting as an interim for incoming boss Julian Nagelsmann. In May 2018, he left RB Leipzig.

Southampton
On 5 December 2018, Hasenhüttl was appointed as the new manager of Southampton, succeeding Mark Hughes making him the first Austrian to manage in the Premier League. At the time of his appointment, Southampton occupied the last relegation place, one point from safety. His first game in charge was a 0–1 defeat at Cardiff City, three days after his appointment. His first win as Southampton's manager came on 16 December in a 3–2 win at home to Arsenal, ending the Gunners' four-month 22-match unbeaten run. On 27 April 2019, Southampton secured Premier League status after a 3–3 draw against Bournemouth at St Mary's. They finished the season in 16th place.

Hasenhüttl's side suffered a 9–0 home loss to Leicester City on 25 October 2019 and the joint-worst loss in Premier League history and worst on home soil; he apologised for the result and was given the club's backing to remain in his job.

In June 2020, he signed a new contract to extend his stay at the club until 2024. Despite being in the relegation zone in early November, Southampton ended the season on a seven-game unbeaten streak to finish in 11th place, their best finish in three seasons. Their final tally of 52 points was the team's highest total since 2015–16, and Hasenhüttl was named Manager of the Month for July 2020.

Southampton began the 2020–21 season strongly, briefly topping the Premier League table at the beginning of November. Despite the positive start, Hasenhüttl's side suffered a second 9–0 defeat away to Manchester United on 2 February 2021. They continued to struggle throughout the rest of the season, eventually finishing 15th.

On 7 November 2022, Southampton parted company with Hasenhüttl. At the time, Southampton were in the Premier League relegation zone with 12 points after 14 games.

Coaching style

Like Jürgen Klopp, Hasenhüttl is a notable proponent of Gegenpressing, a tactic in which the team, after losing possession of the ball, immediately attempts to win back possession, rather than falling back to regroup. This has seen him nicknamed "The Alpine Klopp".

In his first season at Southampton, he initially used a 3-5-2, switching to his preferred 4-2-2-2 mid-way into his second season, as he had previously implemented at RB Leipzig. However, in the 2021–22 season he began sometimes using 3-5-2 and 3-4-3 formations in order to gain more tactical flexibility against different opponents. 

He outlined what he wants to see from his team as "Pressing. Hunting. Be hungry. When you have the ball, find a quick decision, quick transition to the front. It's about being emotional, being full of passion. Also, keep the tempo on a high level and don't slow down the game. That's what I think the people want to see."

Personal life
His son Patrick was born in Mechelen in 1997, while Ralph was playing for K.V. Mechelen, and he currently plays as a forward for VfB Oldenburg.

Managerial statistics

Honours

Player
Austria Wien
Austrian Bundesliga: 1990–91, 1991–92, 1992–93
Austrian Cup: 1991–92, 1993–94

Austria Salzburg
Austrian Bundesliga: 1994–95
Austrian Supercup: 1995

Lierse SK
Belgian Super Cup: 1997

Manager
Aalen
3. Liga promotion: 2011–12

FC Ingolstadt 04
2. Bundesliga: 2014–15

Individual
Premier League Manager of the Month: July 2020

References

1967 births
Living people
Footballers from Graz
Austrian footballers
Association football forwards
Grazer AK players
FK Austria Wien players
FC Red Bull Salzburg players
K.V. Mechelen players
Lierse S.K. players
1. FC Köln players
SpVgg Greuther Fürth players
FC Bayern Munich II players
Austrian Football Bundesliga players
Belgian Pro League players
2. Bundesliga players
Austria international footballers
Austrian expatriate footballers
Expatriate footballers in Belgium
Expatriate footballers in Germany
Austrian football managers
SpVgg Unterhaching managers
VfR Aalen managers
FC Ingolstadt 04 managers
RB Leipzig managers
Southampton F.C. managers
Bundesliga managers
2. Bundesliga managers
3. Liga managers
Premier League managers
Austrian expatriate football managers
Expatriate football managers in Germany
Expatriate football managers in England
Austrian expatriate sportspeople in Germany
Austrian expatriate sportspeople in Belgium
Austrian expatriate sportspeople in England